"Chain Hang Low" is the debut single by American rapper Jibbs from his 2006 debut album Jibbs Featuring Jibbs. It uses a sample of the children's song "Do Your Ears Hang Low?". "Chain Hang Low" peaked at number 7 on the Billboard Hot 100, his only top 40 hit on that chart. It also reached number 6 on the Billboard Hot Rap Songs and 16 on Hot R&B/Hip-Hop Songs charts and charted in countries like Ireland and New Zealand. The song went on to rack up more than 20,000 ringtone downloads in a span of two weeks. The song reached number 50 on Complexs list of the 100 best hip-hop one-hit wonders.

Background
XXL blogger Byron Crawford and The Source have classified this song in a genre of music called "minstrel show rap", because the chorus's melody is taken from the minstrel show song "Turkey in the Straw". Jibbs claims he didn't know the origins of the song.

Chart performance
"Chain Hang Low" debuted at number 69 on the Billboard Hot 100 the week of August 19, 2006. Six weeks later, it reached the top 10 at number 8 on the week of September 30 and maintained that position for three weeks. It peaked at number 7 the week of October 21 and stayed on the chart for twenty weeks.

Music video
Directed by Benny Boom, the video features Jibbs rapping the lyrics while he's moving around his old neighborhood. Along the way, children singing the "Do your chain hang low" hook attempt to steal ice cream from an ice cream truck, and Jibbs fights in a boxing match. The video was shot entirely in a studio on green screen when the production company, Robot Films, lost the permit to shoot the video on the actual streets the night before the scheduled shoot. Everything from the ice cream truck, to the people running, was all simulated in a suburban St. Louis industrial park studio and composited in post-production at the Syndrome Los Angeles production facilities. To maintain the accuracy of Jibbs's home neighborhood, James Larese of the Robot Films collective Syndrome visited the actual neighborhood and took an extensive series of still digital photographs which were added during post production.

Remix
There was an official remix released which featured Yung Joc, Rich Boy, Lil' Mont, and Lil Wayne.

Formats and track listing

Europe 12"
A1. "Chain Hang Low" – 3:32
A2. "Chain Hang Low" (Instrumental) – 3:32
B1. "Hood" – 2:59
Europe CD
1. "Chain Hang Low" (Album Version) – 3:32
2. "Hood" (Album Version) – 2:59

Europe CD (Promo)
1. "Chain Hang Low" (Album Version) – 3:32
2. "Chain Hang Low" (Remix) (feat. Lil Mont, Lil Wayne, Rich Boy, Yung Joc) – 4:06
US CD
1. "Chain Hang Low" (Main Version) – 3:32
2. "Chain Hang Low" (Instrumental) – 3:32

Charts and certifications

Weekly charts

Year-end charts

Certifications

See also
"Do Your Ears Hang Low?", the variant of "Turkey In The Straw" from which the song's chorus is taken.
"G-Slide (Tour Bus)", a 2007 Lil' Mama song that's similar in style.

References

2006 songs
2006 debut singles
Jibbs songs
Geffen Records singles
Music videos directed by Benny Boom
Songs based on children's songs
Pop-rap songs